The Secret Country: The First Australians Fight Back is a 1985 television documentary made for the British Central Independent Television company by writer/presenter John Pilger and producer/director Alan Lowery. It details the persecution of Aboriginal Australians and Torres Strait Islanders throughout Australia's history.

Synopsis
A summary by the National Library of Australia describes the documentary as:

 [Revealing] the often hidden history of Aboriginal Australians from white settlement to the present. The central issue throughout the film is differing perspectives of the land and its uses, providing historical background to the present land rights movement and other areas of Aboriginal activism.
 

Pilger concludes the documentary by stating that: “It seems to me that, until a committed policy of reconciliation, of real nationhood, is offered to the First Australians, those who came recently can never claim their own.”

Production

A Secret Country
Pilger's book A Secret Country was published in 1989. It focuses on the same themes presented in this documentary.

References

External links
The Secret Country: The First Australians Fight Back Full Movie

1985 documentary films
1985 films
Australian documentary films
Documentary films about Aboriginal Australians
Documentary films presented by John Pilger
British television documentaries
1980s English-language films
1980s British films